Ali Suzain (born 11 October 1969) is a Maldivian football coach, and former player.

Honours

Assistant coach
Victory
Cup Winners' Cup: 2002, 2006
Malé League: 2003, 2006
Dhivehi League: 2007
National Championship/Presidents's Cup: 2002, 2003, 2005, 2006

Coach
Coaching career 
1993 1994 coach of Alifushi Zuvaanunge Jamiyyaa / Champions Raa Atoll 
1994 coach SC Elite 3rd Division / Champions 
1995 Dhandimagu ZJ zone final round 
1995 SC Elite 2nd Division / Champions 
1997 1998 coach Hoadhadu ZJ FVM Atoll & Zone tournament 
1999 coach club Eagles Cup winners cup 
2001 2002 player & assistant coach Victory SC 
2003 2004 Coach Victory SC 
Victory
FA Cup: 2009, 2010
President's Cup: 2009, 2011
Maziya
Dhivehi Premier League: 2016
President's Cup: 2015
FA Cup: 2014
Charity Shield: 2015, 2016

References

External links 
 Coach Ali Suzain at Mihaaru Sports (Dhivehi)
 Thinadhoo appoints Suzain as their head coach at Maldivesoccer
 ދެބެން ކޯޗުންގެ ގޮތުގައި، ހާއްސަ މެހެމާނަކީ ބައްޕަ at Mihaaru Sports (Dhivehi)
 ދެބެންގެ ކުރިމަތިލުން ދެ ކްލަބުގެ ކުރިިމަގާ ގުޅިފައި at Mihaaru Sports (Dhivehi)

1969 births
Living people
Maldivian footballers
Victory Sports Club players
Club Valencia players
Association footballers not categorized by position